Hartmut Koch (born 14 November 1944) is a former East German track and field sprinter who competed over 400 metres. He was the inaugural champion at the 1966 European Indoor Games and was runner-up to Manfred Kinder in that event at the 1967 European Indoor Games.

He won four straight national titles in the 400 m at the East German Indoor Athletics Championships from 1966 to 1969. His time of 47.9 seconds was a championship record and the fastest time recorded in the history of that competition on a regular-size track. He represented the club SC Leipzig.

International competitions

See also
List of European Athletics Indoor Championships medalists (men)

References

1944 births
East German male sprinters
German male sprinters
SC Leipzig athletes
Living people